Nascia acutellus, the streaked orange moth, is a moth in the family Crambidae. It was described by Francis Walker in 1866. It is found in North America, where it has been recorded from Nova Scotia to Florida, west to Texas and north to Nebraska, Michigan and Ontario. It was also reported from Colorado. The habitat consists of wet grassy areas with sedges.

The wingspan is about 22 mm. The forewings range from light yellow to orange or brownish with dark brown longitudinal streaks along the veins. The hindwings are pale yellowish with whitish or pale grey shading. Adults are on wing from May to August.

The larvae probably feed on Cyperaceae species.

References

Pyraustinae
Moths described in 1866
Moths of North America
Taxa named by Francis Walker (entomologist)